Wortham may refer to:

Places
Wortham, Suffolk, United Kingdom
Wortham, Missouri, United States
Wortham, Texas, United States
Wortham, Lifton, an historic manor in Devon, England

Other uses
Wortham (surname)